Abel Driggs Santos (born 12 December 1975) is a Cuban male artistic gymnast, representing his nation at international competitions. He participated at the 2004 Summer Olympics. He also competed at world championships, including the 2003 World Artistic Gymnastics Championships in Anaheim.

References

1975 births
Living people
Cuban male artistic gymnasts
Place of birth missing (living people)
Gymnasts at the 2004 Summer Olympics
Olympic gymnasts of Cuba
Pan American Games medalists in gymnastics
Pan American Games gold medalists for Cuba
Pan American Games silver medalists for Cuba
Pan American Games bronze medalists for Cuba
Gymnasts at the 1999 Pan American Games
Gymnasts at the 2003 Pan American Games
21st-century Cuban people
20th-century Cuban people